Angie is diminutive form of four different names in English. It can be the pet form of the feminine Angela or Angelina, or of the masculine Angus or Angel. In Greece the version of the feminine name Angie is Angeliki.

Notable people with the name follow.

Politics
 Angie Bell, Australian politician
 Angie Bray, British Conservative Party politician
 Angie Brooks, Liberian diplomat and jurist, former President of the United Nations General Assembly
 Angie Hatton (born 1972), American politician
 Angela Merkel, Chancellor of Germany, frequently referred to as Angie
 Angie Motshekga, South African Minister of Basic Education
 Angie Paccione, former Colorado legislator
 Angie Heffernan, Fijian human rights and democracy activist
 Angie Zelter, British political activist

Sports
 Angie Akers, American professional beach volleyball player
 Angie Bainbridge, Australian freestyle swimmer and Olympian
 Angie Bradburn, high jumper from the United States
 Angie Braziel, American basketball player in the WNBA
 Angie Hulley (née Pain), British long-distance runner
 Angie Loy, field hockey forward from the United States
 Angie Moretto, Canadian ice hockey forward
 Angie Muller, Australian rules footballer
 Angie Salvagno, bodybuilder from the United States
 Angie Skirving, Australian field hockey player
 Angie Tsang, Hong Kong wushu athlete

Acting
 Angie Cepeda, Colombian actress
 Angie Cheung, Chinese Malaysian actress
 Angie Chiu, Hong Kong actress
 Angie Diaz, Australian actress
 Angie Dickinson, American actress
 Angie Everhart, American actress and former fashion model
 Angie Harmon, American actress and fashion model
 Angie Le Mar, British comedian, writer, director and actor, writer, director and actor
 Angie Milliken, Australian actress

Music
 Angie Aparo, American musician and songwriter
 Angie Brown, British female singer/songwriter
 Angie Hart, Australian pop singer, lead vocalist in the band Frente!
 Angie Reed, American electronica vocalist and musician working in Germany
 Angie Miller (disambiguation), multiple people
 Angie Stone (b. Angela Laverne Brown), American R&B, soul, and neo soul singer-songwriter, keyboardist, record producer, and occasional actress
 B Angie B (b. Angela Boyd), African American female R&B vocalist and dancer
 Miss Angie, real name Angie Turner, American Christian music singer
 Angie Vázquez, Mexican singer

Television and radio
 Angie Coiro, American talk radio host
 Angie Greaves, British radio presenter
 Angie Martinez, American radio and television personality
 Angie Mentink, American sports announcer
 Angie Phillips, British meteorologist

Other
 "Angie" Acland, English pioneer of colour photography
 Angie Best, English-born former Playboy Bunny and model, ex-wife of footballer George Best
 Angie Boissevain, American Soto Zen roshi
 Angie Bonino, Peruvian artist and graphic designer
 Angela Bowie, first wife of David Bowie, often known as Angie Bowie
 Angie Cruz, American/Dominican novelist
Angie Ng, deceased victim of a 2002 murder case in Singapore
 Angie Sage, English author of the Septimus Heap series
 Angie Sanclemente Valencia, former Colombian beauty queen and lingerie model believed to be the ringleader of one of the world's largest drug syndicates
 Angie Thomas (born 1988), American young adult author

Fictional characters
 Angie, from the animated film Shark Tale
 Angie, from the 2006 video game "Need for Speed: Carbon" 
 Angie, from the television series Skins
 Jesse Hubbard and Angie Baxter, a supercouple from the American daytime drama All My Children
 Angie Falco Benson, on the short-lived comedy series Angie
 Angie Bolen, on the ABC television series Desperate Housewives
 Angie Costello-Weeks, on the ABC daytime drama General Hospital
 Angie D'Amato, on the ABC television series Single Parents
 Angie Diaz, on the Disney animated TV series Star vs. the Forces of Evil
 Angie Jeremiah, in Degrassi: The Next Generation
 Angie Lopez, one of the main characters in the television series George Lopez
 Angie Rebecchi, on the Australian soap opera Neighbours
 Angie Reynolds, on the ITV soap opera Emmerdale
 Angie Russell, on the Australian soap opera Home and Away
 Angie Steadman, from the movie Diary of a Wimpy Kid
 Angie Watts, on the UK soap opera EastEnders
Angie Yonaga, from the video game Danganronpa V3: Killing Harmony

Hypocorisms
English given names
English feminine given names

cs:Angie
de:Angie
fr:Angie
it:Angie
nl:Angie
pt:Angie
ro:Angie